Frenchville FC  is a football club based in Rockhampton, Queensland. The club was established in 1948. They competed in the 1979 and 1980 Queensland State League seasons. They currently compete in the Central Queensland Premier League.

External links
 Official club website

References 

Soccer clubs in Queensland
Association football clubs established in 1948
1948 establishments in Australia